Winged horse may also refer to:

 Flying horses, horses with wings
 List of winged horses, for a particular horse with wings
 The Winged Horse, a 1932 theatrical short cartoon
 Winged Hussars, Polish cavalry who wore wings as part of their uniform

See also
 Tianma, East Asian mythological horse, sometimes winged
 Winged unicorn, a unicorn with wings
 List of fictional horses
 Flying horses (disambiguation)
 Pegasus (disambiguation)